Trinectes is a genus of American soles native to the Americas. Most species are coastal, occurring in both salt and brackish water, but several may enter fresh water and one, T. hubbsbollinger, is restricted to rivers. They are fairly small, with the largest species only reaching  in length.

Species
The currently recognised species in this genus are:
 Trinectes fimbriatus (Günther, 1862) (fringed sole)
 Trinectes fluviatilis (Meek & Hildebrand, 1928) (freshwater sole)
 Trinectes fonsecensis (Günther, 1862) (spotted-fin sole)
 Trinectes hubbsbollinger Duplain, Chapleau & Munroe, 2012
 Trinectes inscriptus (P. H. Gosse, 1851) (scrawled sole)
 Trinectes maculatus (Bloch & Schneider, 1801) (hogchoker)
 Trinectes microphthalmus (Chabanaud, 1928)
 Trinectes opercularis (Nichols & Murphy, 1944) (spotted-cheek sole)
 Trinectes paulistanus (A. Miranda-Ribeiro, 1915) (slipper sole)
 Trinectes xanthurus H. J. Walker & Bollinger, 2001

References

Achiridae
Ray-finned fish genera
Taxa named by Constantine Samuel Rafinesque